Huun-Huur-Tu are a music group from Tuva, a Russian federative republic situated on the Mongolia–Russia border. Their music includes throat singing, in which the singers sing both a note and its overtones, thus producing two or three notes simultaneously. The overtone may sound like a flute, whistle or bird, but is solely a product of the human voice.

The group primarily use native Tuvan instruments such as the igil, khomus (Tuvan jaw harp), doshpuluur, and dünggür (shaman drum). However, in recent years, the group have begun to selectively incorporate Western instruments, such as the guitar. While the thrust of Huun-Huur-Tu's music is fundamentally indigenous Tuvan folk music, they also experiment with incorporating Western instruments and electronic music.

History 
The khöömei quartet Kunggurtug was founded in 1992 by Kaigal-ool Khovalyg, brothers Alexander and Sayan Bapa, and Albert Kuvezin. Khovalyg had been involved in the khöömei scene since 1979. Not long afterwards, the group changed its name to Huun-Huur-Tu, meaning "sunbeams" (literally "sun propeller"). The focus of their music was traditional Tuvan folk songs, frequently featuring imagery of the Tuvan steppe or of horses.

The ensemble released its first album, 60 Horses In My Herd, the following year. The album was recorded at studios in London and Mill Valley, California. By the time recording began for the follow-up, Kuvezin had left the group to form the more rock-oriented Yat-Kha. Kuvezin was replaced by Anatoli Kuular, who had previously worked with Khovalyg and Kongar-ool Ondar as part of the Tuva Ensemble. The new line-up recorded The Orphan's Lament in New York City and Moscow, and released it in 1994.

In 1995, Alexander Bapa, who had produced the first two albums, departed the group to pursue production as a full-time career. He was replaced by Alexei Saryglar, formerly a member of the Russian state ensemble Siberian Souvenir. A third album, If I'd Been Born An Eagle, recorded in the Netherlands, followed in 1997. This time, in addition to the traditional folk music, the group performed some rather more contemporary Tuvan songs, from the latter half of the 20th century.

In early 1999, the group released its fourth album, Where Young Grass Grows. For the first time on a Huun-Huur-Tu album, non-Tuvan instruments (except for the guitar) were featured, including harp, tabla, Scottish smallpipe (performed by Martyn Bennett) and synthesiser. The album also features two excerpts of recordings made of Kaigal-ool and Anatoli singing whilst riding horseback on the Tuvan grasslands.

Huun-Huur-Tu participated in the 2000 BBC Music Live event, performing the opening and closing songs for a live, early morning broadcast from Snape Maltings. The following year, the group released their first live album.

In 2003, Kuular quit the group and was replaced by Andrey Mongush, an experienced teacher of khöömei and Tuvan instruments. Mongush's tenure with the group was short and in 2005 he was replaced by Radik Tülüsh, formerly of Yat-Kha fame.

Huun-Huur-Tu signed with Beijing management company Stallion Era in March 2015 and has since been to China for several performances.

Band Members

Collaboration
Since the group's inception, Huun Huur Tu has collaborated with musicians from many genres, such as Frank Zappa, Johnny "Guitar" Watson, the Kodo drummers, The Moscow Art Trio, the Kronos Quartet, The Chieftains and Bulgarian women's singing group, Angelite. Their recording "Eternal" is a collaborative effort with underground electronic musician, Carmen Rizzo. Huun Huur Tu appeared on three songs on Bahamut, the debut of New York-based blues group Hazmat Modine. In January 2010, Hazmat Modine also announced plans to record with Huun Huur Tu again.

In popular culture 
Huun-Huur-Tus Radik Tyulyush's song "Osku Urug" was featured in the American television series Fargos third-season episode "The Law of Vacant Places.". In 2001, several of Huun Hur Tu's songs were featured on the soundtrack of Atanarjuat: The Fast Runner, a 2001 Cannes Winner.

 Gallery 

 Recordings 
Solo releases
 60 Horses In My Herd (1993)
 The Orphan's Lament (1994)
 If I'd Been Born An Eagle (1997)
 Where Young Grass Grows (1999)
 Live 1 [also known as Best * Live] (2001)
 Live 2 (2001)
 More Live (2003)
 Ancestors Call (2010)

With The Bulgarian Voices - Angelite & Sergey Starostin:

 Fly, Fly My Sadness (1996)

With The Bulgarian Voices - Angelite & Moscow Art Trio:

 Mountain Tale (1998)
 Legend (2010)

With various electronic artists (remixes):
 Spirits from Tuva (2002 & 2003)

With Malerija (remix album):
  Huun-huur-tu Malerija (2002)

With Samsonov:
 Altai Sayan Tandy-Uula (2004)

With Sainkho Namtchylak:
 Mother-Earth! Father-Sky! (2008)

With Carmen Rizzo:
 Eternal (2009)

With Vladimir Martynov (chamber orchestra Opus Posth, singer Mikhail Stepanitch & choir Mlada):
 Children of the Otter (2009)Collaborations:'''

With Marcel Vanthilt:
 I Shoot Dikke Jo single (1995)

With Kronos Quartet:
 Early Music (Lachrymae Antiquae) (1997)
18.	"Uleg-Khem"	Trad. Tuvan arr. Steve Mackey	(3:15)

With Hazmat Modine:
 Bahamut (2007)

2. "It Calls Me" (Featuring Huun-Huur-Tu)	Schuman	(3:10)

8. "Everybody Loves You" (Featuring Huun-Huur-Tu)	Schuman	(6:16)

14. "Man Trouble" (Featuring Huun-Huur-Tu)	Jaybird Coleman / Traditional	(11:11)

With Ross Daly:
 The White Dragon'' - Alive (2008)

References

http://www.spectrasonics.net/artists/htu.php
Friends of Tuva
"Deep the Heart of Tuva" article, March 1997.
Kongar-ool Ondar's Homepage
"Singing Stories, in 2 Tones at Once" article, NY Times, January 18,1993.
Huun Huur Tu's MySpace page
Washington Post Article "Tuvan Throat-Singers Perform Feats of Harmonic Acrobatic" January 15, 1996.
Huun Huur Tu: National Geographic World Music bio
"Throat Singers of Tuva Return to Eastman" January 11, 2006.
"Huun Huur Tu - Throat Singers of Tuva" Rootsworld, 2002.
"Huun Huur Tu Throat Singers" University of Hawaii, February 2008.

External links 
Huun-Huur-Tu official site
Greek television advertisement featuring "Eki Attar" from The Orphan's Lament
Directory of high-resolution photographs of the group

Huun-Huur-Tu on On Point Radio, Aired January 13, 2006
BBC Radio Awards for World Music, 2004
Huun-Huur-Tu: Music Refracting Sunlight (Russia-IC.com article)
Huun-Huur-Tu captivates audience with Tuvan music, October 2007
Huun Huur Tu streaming videos
Huun Huur Tu on Youtube
Rare video footage of Andrey Mongush performing xoomei with Huun Huur Tu
Interview with Sayan Bapa, "Huun-Huur-Tu Interview" Kodo Beat, Autumn, 1999.
"Tuvan vocalists impress students" Honolulu Star-Bulletin, February 12, 2004
"Throat singers capture sounds of central Asia" Mail Tribune, October 2006. 
"Videoclip - All one - Odugen Taiga (Mother Taiga)"

Throat singing
Tuvan throat singing
Musical groups from Tuva
Russian folk music groups
Musical groups established in 1992